William Kenneth Whitehill (born 13 June 1934) is a former Welsh cricketer.  Whitehill was a right-handed batsman who played primarily as a wicketkeeper.  He was born at Newport, Monmouthshire.

In 1960, Whitehill played his first first-class match for Glamorgan against Worcestershire at the County Championship.  During the 1960 season, he played 7 first-class matches, the last of which for Glamorgan came against Lancashire at Cardiff Arms Park.

Between 1959 and 1964, he also represented the Glamorgan Second XI in the Second XI Championship 12 times.

References

External links
Willie Whitehill at Cricinfo
Willie Whitehill at CricketArchive

1934 births
Living people
Sportspeople from Newport, Wales
Welsh cricketers
Glamorgan cricketers
Wicket-keepers